Marian Asantewah Nkansah   is a Ghanaian environmental chemist. Her research work focuses on finding solutions to environmental problems associated with levels and fate of toxic substances such as heavy/trace metals, persistent organic pollutants (POPs) and polycyclic aromatic hydrocarbons (PAHs) in food, water, soil, rocks, sediments and other environmental samples. She also researches on the interaction of these pollutants with each other in the environment. In 2016, together with some scientists from the Kwame Nkrumah University of Science and Technology, she led a research which led to the confirmation that edible white clay poses potential cancer risk. In 2016, she became the first scientist to win the Fayzah M. Al-Kharafi Prize, an annual award that recognises exceptional women scientists from scientifically and technologically lagging countries. She and Collins Obuah, another scientist from the University of Ghana, were the two scientist selected to attend the Lindau Nobel Laureate meeting in 2017.In 2021, she was among five women recipients in developing countries of the OWSD-Elsevier Foundation Awards. She received the 2022 Africa Role Model Overall Female Personality Award, and was inducted as a Fellow of the  Ghana Academy of Arts and Sciences  the same year.

Early life and Education 
Nkansah was born in Ghana to Mary and Joseph Nkansah, both educationists. She had her primary and secondary school education at St. Anthony's Experimental School, Nkawkaw and the St. Roses Senior High School at Akwatia, respectively and all in the Eastern Region of Ghana. She then furthered at the Kwame Nkrumah University of Science and Technology where she acquired a bachelor's degree in chemistry and a master's degree in Environmental Chemistry. She holds a PhD in Environmental Chemistry from the University of Bergen in Norway.

Career 
She is an Associate Professor at the Chemistry department of Kwame Nkrumah University of Science and Technology where she teaches Practical Chemistry, Nuclear/Radiochemistry, Chemistry and Society, and Petroleum Chemistry. She is a past warden of Africa Hall of Residence and the Deputy Director of Student Affairs in charge of Welfare at KNUST. She serves on the Executive Committee of the International Year of Basic Science for Sustainable Development. Nkansah is a former executive member and alumna of the Global Young Academy.
She is also a board member of the Ghana Geological Survey Authority and Fellow of the Ghana Academy of Arts and Sciences.

Awards and recognition 
Nkansah has been recognised and awarded for her work including:

 Fellow of the Ghana Academy of Arts and Sciences
 Affiliate of the African Academy of Sciences
Featured in the first-ever book on African Women in Science
 Next Einstein Forum Fellow
 2016 - Winner of the Fayzah M. Al-Kharafi Prize
 2017 - Selected to attend Lindau Nobel Laureate meeting
2017 - Selection to the Global Young Academy

References

Living people
1979 births
Kwame Nkrumah University of Science and Technology alumni
Ghanaian chemists
Ghanaian women scientists
Ghanaian women academics
University of Bergen alumni
Alumni of St Roses Senior High school (Akwatia)
Fellows of the Ghana Academy of Arts and Sciences